Racinoa leucoides is a moth in the Bombycidae family. It was described by Strand in 1910. It is found in Tanzania.

The larvae feed on Ficus elastica.

References

Natural History Museum Lepidoptera generic names catalog

Bombycidae
Moths described in 1910